511 may refer to:

The year 511 AD of the Common Era
The year 511 BC before the Common Era
The number 511 (number)
The telephone number 5-1-1, used for transportation information in many regions of Canada and the United States of America
511 keV, the energy of each of the two photons created when a positron and an electron annihilate

See also

 
 51 (disambiguation)